Aşağıçakmak can refer to:

 Aşağıçakmak, Keban
 Aşağıçakmak, Köprüköy